Foreign relations exist between Australia and Serbia.  The two countries maintained diplomatic relations established by Australia and SFR Yugoslavia in 1966.  Australia has an embassy in Belgrade. Serbia has an embassy in Canberra and a general consulate in Sydney. The European office of the Australian Federal Police is located in Belgrade as of 2003.

In the 2006 Australian Census, 95,364 people identified themselves as having Serbian origin.

In 2006–07 period, Australian merchandise export to Serbia were about A$2.04 million, consisting primarily of toys, games and sporting goods. In the same period, Serbian exports were about A$3.19 million, consisting mainly of preserved food products. 

The Australian government took over all the bilateral treaties and agreements signed with the former Yugoslavia in its relations with Serbia, with reserve of cessation of certain contracts if they are considered to be surpassed. There are nine agreements in force, among which the most important are trade agreement, agreement of residence and employment of Serbian citizens in Australia and the Agreement on cultural cooperation. Cultural and education relations are based on the Agreement on cultural and scientific cooperation, which was concluded between the governments of two countries on 14 September 1976.

There have been no visits of heads of state or government between two countries in recent years. The delegation led by MPs Roger Price and Danna Vale and Senator Judith Troeth visited Serbia in October 2008 while the delegation led by Slavica Đukić Dejanović visited Australia in September 2009.

See also 
 Australian Serbs
 Australia–Yugoslavia relations

References

External links
 Australian Department of Foreign Affairs and Trade about relations with Serbia
  Australian embassy in Belgrade
  Serbian Ministry of Foreign Affairs about relations with Australia
  Increasing Australian Business Activities with Serbia
 Embassy of The Republic of Serbia in Canberra

 
Serbia 
Bilateral relations of Serbia